The Kakhovka Hydroelectric Station is a run-of-river power plant on the Dnieper River in Nova Kakhovka, Ukraine. Nova Kakhovka is a port city located on the reservoir's southern bank. The primary purposes of the dam are hydroelectric power generation, irrigation and navigation. It is the 6th and the last dam in the Dnieper reservoir cascade. The deep water channel allows shipping up and down river. The facility also includes a winter garden.

The P47 road and a railway cross the Dnieper River on the dam.

The Kakhovka Hydroelectric Power Plant had 241 staff in October 2015. The director is Yaroslav Kobelya from September 2012. As of 2019, the dam was profitable bringing 6.1 million UAH to local government budgets and 44.6 million UAH to the national income.

Dam
The dam has an associated lock and a power station with an installed capacity of 357 MW. Water from Kakhovka Reservoir is cooling the 5.7 GW Zaporizhzhia Nuclear Power Plant, and also sent via the North Crimean Canal and Dnieper–Kryvyi Rih Canal to irrigate large areas of southern Ukraine and northern Crimea. Construction on the dam began in September 1950. The last generator was commissioned in October 1956. It is operated by Ukrhydroenergo.

Starting in 2019 significant repairs and expansion were made to the facility.

2022 Russian invasion of Ukraine
On 24 February 2022, the power plant was captured by Russian forces during the 2022 Invasion of Ukraine. During weeks of artillery attacks by Ukraine in August and September, Ukrainian and Russian officials reported that the facility's ability to transport vehicles had been degraded, but the dam itself retained structural integrity.

In mid-October 2022, news reports suggested that Russians may be planning to blow up the dam to slow down the Ukrainian counter offensive in the region.

On 11 November, a large explosion occurred on the dam, shown on CCTV footage. The road and rail sections were destroyed, but the dam itself was mostly undamaged.

Since early November 2022, the spillways at the dam have been opened, and the Kakhovka Reservoir has dropped to it's lowest level in 3 decades, putting irrigation and drinking water resources at risk, as well as the coolant systems for the Zaporizhzhia Nuclear Power Plant. Between December 1st, 2022 and February 6th, 2023 the water level has dropped 2 meters.

See also

 Hydroelectricity in Ukraine
 FC Enerhiya Nova Kakhovka
 Dnipriany River Port

References

Further reading 

Buildings and structures in Kherson Oblast
Dams on the Dnieper
Hydroelectric power stations in Ukraine
Run-of-the-river power stations
Energy infrastructure completed in 1956
Hydroelectric power stations built in the Soviet Union
1956 establishments in the Soviet Union
1956 establishments in Ukraine